Medina is a municipality in the northeast of the Brazilian state of Minas Gerais.  Its population in 2020 was 20,759 inhabitants in a total area of 1,440 km2.  

Medina belongs to the Pedra Azul statistical microregion.  The elevation of the municipal seat is 587 meters.  It became a municipality in 1938.  This municipality is located on the important BR-116 Rio-Bahia highway.  It is 65 km. south of the boundary with the state of Bahia.  It is 710 km. to the state capital, Belo Horizonte.

The main economic activities are cattle raising, granite extraction, semi-precious stones, and farming. Like many other towns along the BR-116 highway, prostitution is also a source of income for many families, parents who often also grew up selling their bodies for sex, often get their children, mainly daughters, as young as 12 to get paid for sexual acts for motorists.   The GDP was R$71,218,000 (2005).  There were 2 banking agencies in 2006.  In the rural area there were 976 farms with around 2,800 people involved in the agricultural sector.  There were 27 tractors, a ratio of one tractor for every 30 farms.  The main crops were bananas, coffee, oranges, mangoes, sugarcane, beans, manioc, and corn.  In the health sector there were 6 health clinics and 1 hospital with 66 beds.  The score on the Municipal Human Development Index was 0.645 (medium).  This ranked Medina 759 out of 853 municipalities in the state, with Poços de Caldas in first place with 0.841 and Setubinha in last place with 0.568. See Frigoletto for the complete list. 
Illiteracy rate: 29.78% (2000)
Infant mortality rate: 36.52% (2000)
Life expectancy: 65.6 (average of male and female) (2000)
Percentage of urban area with sewer connections: 79.70% (2000)

References

Statistics from IBGE
Indicadores Minas—info on health and education

See also
List of municipalities in Minas Gerais

Municipalities in Minas Gerais